Coleophora glaucella is a moth of the family Coleophoridae. It is found in the United States, including California.

The larvae feed on the leaves of Arctostaphylos glauca. They create a spatulate leaf case.

References

glaucella
Moths described in 1882
Moths of North America